Grisù il draghetto is an animated Italian television series whose title character is Grisù, a dragon.

The character was created by the Italian brothers Nino and Toni Pagot (best known as the creators of Calimero). It first appeared in a 1964 black-and-white animated series of commercial shorts for the Mentafredda Caremoli candies, part of the television program Carosello. A television series consisting of 52 episodes with the adventures of Grisù aired for the first time in 1972. The character also named a series of book for children.

The protagonist of the series is a young dragon named Grisù that, despite being the youngest of a large breed of dragons, the Draconis, dreams of becoming a firefighter.

On November 18, 2020, it was announced that a CGI revival of the series is currently in the works.

International broadcast
Italy
Rai 1
Boomerang
Boing
Germany
ZDF
ARD
Pro7
Sat.1
Kabel 1
Nickelodeon
France
Canal+
M6
Canal J
France 3
Canada
Ici Radio-Canada Télé
TVOntario
Czech Republic
ČT1 (at this time as ČST1)
Slovakia
Jednotka (also at this time as ČST1, but it was broadcast in Slovak)
 South Africa
 SABC1 as 'Groenie die drakie' (Little green the little dragon) dubbed into Afrikaans
Arab League
Various regional channels in the Arab League countries
Australia
 ABC
United States
 PBS
Spain
 La 1
Minimax
 Televisión de Galicia
 Telemadrid

DVD releases
In Italy, the entire 52-episode main show was released in a 13-volume DVD series.

In Germany, ARD Home Video released Volume 1, Volume 2, Volume 3, and Volume 4 on October 7, 2003.

References

1970s animated television series
1975 Italian television series debuts
1975 Italian television series endings
1970s Italian television series
Italian children's animated fantasy television series
Fictional dragons
YTV (Canadian TV channel) original programming
PBS original programming
Australian Broadcasting Corporation original programming